Mohd Daudsu Bin Jamaludin (born 18 March 1985) is a Malaysian professional footballer who plays as a right back for Malaysia FAM League club D'AR Wanderers.

Daudsu made his debut with the Malaysia national team in the 2010 World Cup qualifying Asian zone against Bahrain on 21 October 2007 at Bahrain National Stadium, Manama. In August 2007, Daudsu was one of the pillars in Malaysia Under-23 team that won 2007 Merdeka Tournament. During the final Malaysia won 3–1 against Myanmar. In 2008, during Samsung Chelsea Asia Tour 2008 Daudsu was selected to be in the Malaysia national team but did not play in that friendly match against Chelsea.

Club career

Johor FC
Daudsu was part of Johor FC team from 2006/07 and 2007/08 season. He returned to Kelantan FA after finishing his contract with Johor. Best Achievement Daudsu with Johor are leading the team to the semi-finals of the 2008 Malaysia Cup.

Kelantan FA
During 2011 Malaysia FA Cup final while playing against Terengganu Daudsu accidentally scored an own goal in the last minutes of the match after his team already leads by 1–0. Nordin Alias scored the winning goal for Terengganu. He helped Kelantan gain the treble in 2012 by winning 2012 Malaysia FA Cup, 2012 Malaysia Super League and 2012 Malaysia Cup. He also part of Kelantan winning squad during 2013 Malaysia FA Cup won in the final against the newly rebuild team, Johor Darul Ta'zim which he later joined for 2 seasons.

Johor Darul Ta'zim F.C.
During 2014 and 2015 Malaysia Super League seasons, Daudsu playing for Johor Darul Ta'zim F.C. He rarely played in the team end up made no appearances in 2014 season and made 4 appearances in 2015 season. He made his debut with the team in the 2015 AFC Champions League qualifying play-off against Bangkok Glass that end up his team lost 3–0.

Return to Kelantan FA
In 2016, Daudsu return to his former team to give Kelantan so much needed experience after a successful two-year stint with Johor Darul Ta'zim.

Statistics

Club
As of 28 October 2017.

International

Honours

Club honours
Johor Darul Takzim
 Piala Sumbangsih: 2015 Winner
 Liga Super (2) : 2014, 2015
 2014 Piala Malaysia :Runner Up
 2015 AFC Cup :Winner

Johor FC
 Liga Super: 3rd Place: 2007-08

Kelantan FA
 Liga Super: 2011, 2012; Runner-up 2010
 Piala Malaysia: 2010, 2012; Runner-up 2009
 Piala FA: 2012, 2013; Runner-up 2011, 2009
 Piala Sumbangsih: 2011; Runner-up 2012
 Piala Emas Raja-Raja : 2005, 2009, 2010; Runner-up 2006

References

External links
 Daudsu Jamaludin at SoccerPunter.com
 
 
 Mohd Daudsu Jamaludin's Profile at F.A.M. website

1985 births
Living people
Malaysian footballers
Malaysian people of Malay descent
Malaysia international footballers
People from Kota Bharu
Kelantan FA players
People from Kelantan
Association football defenders